Bir Devinder Singh is an Indian Politician from the state of Punjab. He was the deputy speaker of the Punjab Legislative Assembly between 2003 and 2004.  S. Bir Devinder Singh is  a man of acumen who works with conviction though it would not go well with the most of the practicing politicians and because of which he has been kept away from the power with the connivance of the ruling Congress and erstwhile rulers of the state, Akali Dal-BJP. Bir Devinder Singh vows by clean practices for which he has been awarded the Best Parliamentarian yet the ticket from the Congress bandwagon eluded him because they deemed him unfit despite the award. 

Bir Devinder Singh is a name synonymous with truth and honesty in the political scenario of Punjab. After graduating as a leader of All India Sikh Students Federation, Bir Devinder Singh was chosen by the Congress to fight election from Sirhind in 1980 which he won with a handsome margin and he was active in the political affairs of the constituency by working to improve the literacy of the state, improve health and sanitation, and to improve the infrastructure of the Sirhind district.

Then he came to power again in 2002 on the Congress ticket and was promptly made a Deputy Speaker for his vocal strengths and intelligent questioning in the affairs of the state. During his tenure as a Deputy Speaker, he worked diligently for Mohali, getting the stature of a district for Mohali and establishing Greater Mohali Area on the lines of Noida.

Constituency
Singh represented the Kharar assembly constituency from 2002 to 2007.
He also represented Sirhind Constituency from 1980 to 1985.He was declared the best parliamentarian for the Legislative Assembly term from 2002 to 2007

Political Party  
Singh is from the Indian National Congress but was expelled from the party as he raised his voice against the corruption done by Congress Chief Capt Amarinder Singh.

He joined Shiromani Akali Dal (Taksali) on 5 February 2019.

References 

Living people
People from Punjab, India
Punjab, India politicians
Indian National Congress politicians
Year of birth missing (living people)
Shiromani Akali Dal politicians